European Forest Genetic Resources Programme (EUFORGEN) is an international network that supports the conservation and sustainable use of forest genetic resources in Europe. The programme’s tasks include to coordinate and promote in situ and ex situ conservation of forest genetic resources, to facilitate the exchange of information, and to increase public awareness of the need to conserve forest genetic resources.
 
EUFORGEN is funded by member countries and operates through working groups formed by experts from across Europe who meet to exchange knowledge, analyse policies and practice, and develop science-based strategies to improve the management of forest genetic resources. EUFORGEN was established in 1994. Its secretariat, hosted by the European Forest Institute, is located in Barcelona, Spain.

Member countries
There are currently a total of 25 member countries in Europe (January, 2021)

References

Forest conservation organizations
Genetics databases
Organisations based in Barcelona
Plant breeding
Plant genetics
Seed associations
Trees of Europe